Eoin MacNeill (born John McNeill; 15 May 1867 – 15 October 1945) was an Irish scholar, Irish language enthusiast, Gaelic revivalist, nationalist and politician who served as Minister for Education from 1922 to 1925, Ceann Comhairle of Dáil Éireann from 1921 to 1922, Minister for Industries 1919 to 1921 and Minister for Finance January 1919 to April 1919. He served as a Teachta Dála (TD) from 1918 to 1927. He was a Member of Parliament (MP) for Londonderry City from 1918 to 1922 and a Member of the Northern Ireland Parliament (MP) for Londonderry from 1921 to 1925.

A key figure of the Gaelic revival, MacNeill was a co-founder of the Gaelic League, to preserve Irish language and culture. He has been described as "the father of the modern study of early Irish medieval history".

He established the Irish Volunteers in 1913 and served as Chief-of-Staff of the minority faction after its split in 1914 at the start of the World War. He held that position at the outbreak of the Easter Rising in 1916, but had no role in the Rising or its planning, which was carried out by his nominal subordinates, including Patrick Pearse, who were members of the secret society, the Irish Republican Brotherhood. On learning of the plans to launch an uprising on Easter Sunday, and after confronting Pearse about it, MacNeill issued a countermanding order, placing a last-minute newspaper advertisement instructing Volunteers not to take part.

In 1918 he was elected to the First Dáil as a member of Sinn Féin.

Early life
MacNeill was born John McNeill, one of five children born to Archibald McNeill, a Roman Catholic working-class baker, sailor and merchant, and his wife, Rosetta (née McAuley) McNeill, also a Catholic. He was raised in Glenarm, County Antrim, an area which "still retained some Irish-language traditions". His niece was nationalist and teacher, Máirín Beaumont.

MacNeill was educated at St Malachy's College (Belfast) and Queen's College, Belfast. He had an interest in Irish history and immersed himself in its study. He achieved a BA degree in economics, jurisprudence and constitutional history in 1888, and then worked in the British Civil Service.

He co-founded the Gaelic League in 1893, along with Douglas Hyde; MacNeill was unpaid secretary from 1893 to 1897, and then became the initial editor of the League's official newspaper An Claidheamh Soluis (1899–1901). He was also editor of the Gaelic Journal from 1894 to 1899. In 1908, he was appointed professor of early Irish history at University College Dublin.

He married Agnes Moore on 19 April 1898. The couple had eight children, four sons and four daughters (though the 1911 census entry for Mac Neill noted 11 children, seven of whom were still alive).

Irish Volunteers
The Gaelic League was from the start strictly non-political, but in 1915, a proposal was put forward to abandon that policy and become a semi-political organisation. MacNeill strongly supported that and rallied to his side a majority of delegates at the 1915 Oireachtas. Douglas Hyde, a non-political Protestant, who had co-founded the League and been its president for 22 years, resigned immediately afterward.

Through the Gaelic League, MacNeill met members of Sinn Féin, the Irish Republican Brotherhood (IRB), and other nationalists and republicans. One such colleague, The O'Rahilly, ran the league's newspaper An Claidheamh Soluis, and in October 1913 they asked MacNeill to write an editorial for it on a subject more broad than Irish language issues. MacNeill submitted a piece called "The North Began", encouraging formation of a nationalist volunteer force committed to Irish Home Rule, much as the unionists had done earlier that year with the Ulster Volunteers to thwart Home Rule in Ireland.

Bulmer Hobson, a member of the IRB, approached MacNeill about bringing the idea to fruition, and, through a series of meetings, MacNeill became chairman of the council that formed the Irish Volunteers, later becoming its chief of staff. Unlike the IRB, MacNeill was opposed to the idea of an armed rebellion, except in resisting any suppression of the Volunteers, seeing little hope of success in open battle against the British army.

The Irish Volunteers had been infiltrated by the Irish Republican Brotherhood, which planned on using the organisation to stage an armed rebellion, with the goal of separating Ireland from the United Kingdom and establishing an Irish Republic. The entry of the UK into the First World War was, in their view, a perfect opportunity to do that. With the co-operation of James Connolly and the Irish Citizen Army, a secret council of IRB officials planned a general rising at Easter 1916. On the Wednesday before Easter, they presented MacNeill with a letter, allegedly stolen from high-ranking British staff in Dublin Castle, indicating that the British were going to arrest him and all the other nationalist leaders. Unbeknownst to MacNeill, the letter—called the Castle Document—was a forgery.

When MacNeill learned about the IRB's plans, and when he was informed that Roger Casement was about to land in County Kerry with a shipment of German arms, he was reluctantly persuaded to go along with them, believing British action was now imminent and that mobilization of the Irish Volunteers would be justified as a defensive act. However, after learning that the German arms shipment had been intercepted and Casement arrested, and having confronted Patrick Pearse, who refused to relent, MacNeill countermanded the order for the Rising by sending written messages to leaders around the country, and placing a notice in the Sunday Independent cancelling the planned "manoeuvres". That greatly reduced the number of volunteers who reported for duty on the day of the Easter Rising.

Pearse, Connolly and the others agreed that the uprising would go ahead anyway, but it began one day later than originally intended to ensure that the authorities were taken by surprise. Beginning on Easter Monday, 24 April 1916, the Rising lasted less than a week. After the surrender of the rebels, MacNeill was arrested although he had taken no part in the insurrection. The rebel leader Tom Clarke, according to his wife Kathleen, warned her on the day before his execution, "I want you to see to it that our people know of his treachery to us. He must never be allowed back into the National life of this country, for so sure as he is, so sure will he act treacherously in a crisis. He is a weak man, but I know every effort will be made to whitewash him."

Political life
MacNeill was released from prison in 1917 and was elected MP for the National University and Londonderry City constituencies for Sinn Féin in the 1918 general election. In line with abstentionist Sinn Féin policy, he refused to take his seat in the British House of Commons in London and sat instead in the newly convened Dáil Éireann in Dublin, where he was made Secretary for Industries in the second ministry of the First Dáil. He was a member of the Parliament of Northern Ireland for Londonderry between 1921 and 1925, although he never took his seat. In 1921, he supported the Anglo-Irish Treaty. In 1922, he was in a minority of pro-Treaty delegates at the Irish Race Convention in Paris. Following the establishment of the Irish Free State, he became Minister for Education in its second (provisional) government, the third Dáil.

In 1923, MacNeill, a committed internationalist, was also a key member of the diplomatic team that oversaw Ireland's entry to the League of Nations.

MacNeill's family was split on the treaty issue. One son, Brian, took the anti-Treaty side and was killed in disputed circumstances near Sligo by Free State troops during the Irish Civil War in September 1922. Two other sons, Niall and Turloch, as well as nephew Hugo MacNeill, served as officers in the Free State Army. One of Eoin's brothers, James McNeill, was the second and penultimate Governor-General of the Irish Free State.

Irish Boundary Commission
In 1924 the three man Irish Boundary Commission was set up to settle the border between Northern Ireland and the Irish Free State; MacNeill represented the Irish Free State. MacNeill was the only member of the Commission without legal training and has been described as having been “pathetically out of his depth”. However, each of the Commissioners was selected out of political expediency rather than for any established competence or insight into boundary making. On 7 November 1925, a conservative British newspaper, The Morning Post, published a leaked map showing a part of eastern County Donegal (mainly The Laggan district) that was to be transferred to Northern Ireland; the opposite of the main aims of the Commission. Perhaps embarrassed by that, especially since he said that it had declined to respect the terms of the Treaty, MacNeill resigned from the Commission on 20 November. On 24 November 1925 he also resigned as Minister for Education, a position unrelated to his work on the Commission.

On 3 December 1925, the Free State government agreed with the governments in London and Belfast to end its onerous treaty requirement to pay its share of the United Kingdom's "imperial debt" and, in exchange, agreed that the 1920 boundary would remain as it was, overriding the Commission. That angered many nationalists and MacNeill was the subject of much criticism, but in reality, he and the Commission had been sidestepped by the intergovernmental debt renegotiation. In any case, despite his resignations, the intergovernmental boundary deal was approved by a Dáil vote of 71–20 on 10 December 1925, and MacNeill is listed as voting with the majority in favour. He lost his Dáil seat at the June 1927 election.

Academic
MacNeill was an important scholar of Irish history and among the first to study Early Irish law, offering both his own interpretations, which at times were coloured by his nationalism, and  translations into English. He was also the first to uncover the nature of succession in Irish kingship, and his theories are the foundation for modern ideas on the subject.

He was a contributor to the Royal Irish Academy's Clare Island Survey, recording the Irish place names of the island. On 25 February 1911, he delivered the inaugural address on "Academic Education and Practical Politics" to the Legal and Economic Society of University College Dublin.. His disagreements and disputes with Goddard Henry Orpen, particularly over the latter's book Ireland under the Normans, generated controversy.

He was President of the Royal Society of Antiquaries of Ireland from 1937 to 1940 and President of the Royal Irish Academy from 1940 to 1943.

Later life and death
He retired from politics completely and became Chairman of the Irish Manuscripts Commission. In his later years he devoted his life to scholarship, he published a number of books on Irish history. MacNeill died in Dublin of natural causes, aged 78 in 1945.

Legacy
His grandson Michael McDowell served as Tánaiste, Minister for Justice, Equality and Law Reform, TD and a Senator. Another grandson, Myles Tierney, served as a member of Dublin County Council, where he was Fine Gael whip on the council.

Works
Ireland Before Saint Patrick (1903) 
Duanaire Finn: the book of the lays of Fionn (1908) 
Early Irish population groups: their nomenclature, classification and chronology (1911)
The Authorship and Structure of the Annals of Tigernach (1913)
Phases of Irish history (1919) 
The Irish law of dynastic succession (1919) 
The Case for an Irish Republic (1920) 
Celtic Ireland (1921)
History of Ireland: Pre-Christian times to 1921 (1932)
Saint Patrick, Apostle of Ireland (1934)
Early Irish laws and institutions (1935)
The Irish Nation and Irish culture (1938)
Military service in Medieval Ireland (1941)

References

External links

Tierney/MacNeill Photographs, collection of over 500 images, the largest parts of the collection relate to the political and academic careers of Eoin MacNeill and his son-in-law Michael Tierney, UCD Digital Library Collection.

1867 births
1945 deaths
Academics of University College Dublin
Alumni of Queen's University Belfast
Burials at Kilbarrack Cemetery
Cumann na nGaedheal TDs
Early Sinn Féin TDs
Irish magazine editors
Irish newspaper editors
20th-century Irish historians
Members of the 1st Dáil
Members of the 2nd Dáil
Members of the 3rd Dáil
Members of the 4th Dáil
Members of the House of Commons of Northern Ireland for County Londonderry constituencies
Members of the Parliament of the United Kingdom for County Londonderry constituencies (1801–1922)
Members of the Parliament of the United Kingdom for the National University of Ireland
Ministers for Education (Ireland)
Ministers for Finance (Ireland)
Members of the House of Commons of Northern Ireland 1921–1925
People educated at St Malachy's College
People from County Antrim
People of the Irish Civil War (Pro-Treaty side)
Presiding officers of Dáil Éireann
Teachtaí Dála for the National University of Ireland
UK MPs 1918–1922
Presidents of the Royal Irish Academy